Nucleotide-binding protein 2 (NBP 2) also known as cytosolic Fe-S cluster assembly factor NUBP2 is a protein that in humans is encoded by the NUBP2 gene.

NUBP2 is a member of the NUBP/MRP gene subfamily of ATP-binding proteins. There are two types in eukaryotes NUBP1 and NUBP2, and one novel human gene that define NBP nucleotide-binding proteins (NUBP/MRP-multidrug resistance-associated protein) in mammalian cells requires the maturation of cytosolic     iron-sulfur (Fe/S) proteins as Nubp1 is involved in the formation of extramitochondrial Fe/S proteins the cell division inhibitor MinD is homologous and involve two proteins components of the (FeS) protein assembly machinery closely similar cytosolic soluble P loop NTPase where Nar1 is required for assembly, identified Cfd1p in cytosolic and nuclear Fe/S protein biogenesis in yeast. Nubp proteins NTPase Nbp35p. MinD is homologous to members in MinD of E. coli, a relative of the ParA family.

Morphology

Further information: Morphology (biology)

NBP35 bacterial plasmids F (the classical Escherichia coli sex factor) is found in all nuclear genes in vegetative and gametic flagella of the unicellular green algae  C. reinhardtii and nuclear Fe/S protein biogenesis required for cytosolic iron-sulfur protein assembly; MNP =MRP-like; MRP (Multiple Resistance and pH adaptation) MRP/NBP35-like P-loop NTPase similar to; and functions as minD_arch; cell division ATPase MinD, archaeal and homologue's of NUBP1. The NBP35 gene is conserved in archaea Bacteria, Metazoa, Fungi and other Eukaryotes and with considerable divergence from the yeast; Cfd1-Nbp35 Fe-S to man. In a scaffold complex protein to form large molecular assemblies that store Fe(III) and 4Fe-4S seen as secondary to defects inactivated to accomplish its functions as physiologically relevant form(s) Fe/S proteins Iron regulatory protein 1 (IRP1)  is regulated through prevents deficiencies and increased mutation rates that characterized a plant P loop NTPase with sequence similarity to Nbp35 homologue's of NUBP1.

Interactions 

NUBP2 has been shown to interact with...
ACO1 Iron-responsive element-binding protein 1 (IRE-BP 1) (Iron regulatory protein 1) (IRP1)
MAPK8IP3 C-jun-amino-terminal kinase-interacting protein 3 (JNK-interacting protein 3) (JIP-3)
IGFALS Insulin-like growth factor-binding protein complex acid labile chain precursor (ALS)
KIF11 Kinesin-like protein KIF11 (Kinesin-related motor protein Eg5)
SEPP1 Selenoprotein P precursor (SeP)
CA1 Carbonic anhydrase 1 (EC 4.2.1.1) (Carbonic anhydrase I) (Carbonate dehydratase I) (CA-I)

References

Further reading